Thomas Edward Melchior is an American teacher and author from the U.S. state of Minnesota.  Melchior was born in 1936 hand grew up in south central Minnesota, graduating from Belle Plaine Senior High School in 1954.  He attended St. John's University, where he was a four-year baseball team starter. Melchior graduated from St. John's with a B.A. in English in 1958, and later completed a M.Ed. at the University of St. Thomas.

Teaching career
After short stints at public schools in the small Minnesota cities of Montgomery and New Prague, and one year teaching and coaching in Humacao, Puerto Rico, Melchior accepted a teaching position in the Burnsville, Minnesota public school system.  He spent 30 years teaching in Burnsville schools, including both Metcalf and Nicollet Junior High Schools and Burnsville Senior High School.  Melchior received one of the premier accolades for teaching professionals in Minnesota when he was named Minnesota Teacher of the Year in 1971 by the Minnesota Education Association.  He retired from full-time education in 1993, and was one of only five teachers inducted into the inaugural class of the Burnsville Senior High School Hall of Fame in 2006.

Writing career
Tom Melchior's first book, "They Called Me Teacher", was published in 1996.  The book is a comprehensive oral history of country school teachers from throughout Minnesota from the early twentieth century.  Melchior interviewed well over 200 former one-room school teachers from all over Minnesota.  The book was awarded honorable mention in 1997 by the Minnesota Independent Publishers Association.

In 2002 he published his teaching memoir, "From Both Sides of the Desk", which recounts his life and experiences as both a student and a teacher.

Since 2002, Tom Melchior has written extensively about the history of men's amateur baseball in the Minnesota River Valley.  While his works "Belle Plaine Baseball 1890 - 1960" and "The History of Baseball in Scott County" had only limited commercial success, they provide an important resource for local historians.

Melchior resides near Minneapolis.

References

Citations 
 .

American non-fiction writers
Living people
Year of birth missing (living people)